Biomedical Computation Review (BCR) is a quarterly, open-access magazine funded by the National Institutes of Health and published by the Mobilize Center at Stanford University. First published in 2005, BCR covers such topics as molecular dynamics, genomics, proteomics, physics-based simulation, systems biology, and other research involving computational biology. BCR's articles are targeted to those with a general science or biology background, in order to build a community among biomedical computational researchers who come from a variety of disciplines.

Notes

External links 
 Biomedical Computation Review 
 Simbios

Stanford University publications
Quarterly journals
National Institutes of Health
Publications established in 2005
Open access publications